Borovki is a rural locality (a khutor) in Avilovskoye Rural Settlement, Ilovlinsky District, Volgograd Oblast, Russia. The population was 127 as of 2010. There are 5 streets.

Geography 
Borovki is located in steppe, on the Volga Upland, 15 km north of Ilovlya (the district's administrative centre) by road. Avilov is the nearest rural locality.

References 

Rural localities in Ilovlinsky District